Five Points Correctional Facility (FPCF) is a maximum security state prison for men located in Romulus, New York, and operated by the New York State Department of Corrections and Community Supervision. Five Points is known as a supermax prison.

History
The prison was built in 2000 with a capacity of 1,500 inmates, as well as a Special Housing Unit (SHU) for up to 50 inmates in disciplinary confinement. Five Points was originally named for the five points that are seen from above, showing each housing block location. As of 2008, 71% of the inmates were convicted of a violent crime and 16% of the inmates were being treated for mental health issues.

FPCF's academic courses included Adult  Basic Education (ABE) and Pre-High School Equivalency (Pre-HSE), and High School Equivalency (HSE). Vocational courses included building maintenance, custodial maintenance, painting/decorating, computer operator, electrical trades, horticulture/ agriculture, small engine repair, masonry, and plumbing/heating. The library contained approximately 3,000 books and periodicals.

Notable inmates
 Demetrius Blackwell – Convicted of First Degree Murder and sentenced to life in prison without the possibility of parole in 2017 for the murder of New York City Police Officer Brian Moore in Queens Village, NY on May 2, 2015 (Moore survived the shooting, but died two days later). Moore was posthumously promoted to the rank of Detective, 1st grade by New York City Police Commissioner William Bratton at his funeral.
 Willie Bosket – Adult repeat offender who, in 1978, received the maximum five-year sentence for multiple murder as a (fifteen-year-old) juvenile, causing New York to become the first state to change its laws so that juveniles as young as 13 could be tried as an adult for murder.
 Peter Braunstein – former journalist, writer, and playwright dubbed the "Halloween rapist"
 Lemuel Smith – Serial killer and rapist. Convicted of killing six people between 1958 and 1981, including the first ever murder (1981) of an on-duty female corrections officer by an inmate at a prison.
 David Sweat – Transferred there after 2015 escape from Clinton Correctional Facility in Dannemora, New York
 Manuel Rivera- Bronx trinitarios gang member serving 23 years to life. Convicted of 1st degree murder for participating in the murder of Lesandro Guzman-Feliz. Rivera was the youngest of the gang members being 18 at the time. Transferred to Great Meadow Correctional Facility in March 2021.
 Jamir Thompson-Thompson, of Yonkers, has been sentenced to nine years to life in state prison. Thompson pled guilty on July 8 to Murder in the Second Degree, a felony, for the fatal shooting of 18-year-old Marilyn Cotto-Montanez.

Educational program
Five Points is most famous for its educational program that it made with its prisoners. Five Point correctional facility and Cornell paired together to be able to help the prisoners get education. This program was called the Cornell Prison Education Program or CPEP, in which Five points pairs with Cornell’s partner Cayuga Community College. On May 24, 2018 the first class was able to graduate in Romulus, New York (the city where Five Points is located). This class contained sixteen graduates overall, as they all received their Associate of Arts degrees surrounded by all of their families.

According to Cornell.edu the graduating class included Jonathan Amidon, Donnell Baines, Jermaine Barrett, Jeffrey Berkley, Dedric Chislum, Chicko Dillard, Ansel Gouveia, Michael Hesse, Aaron Jarzynka, Jesse Johnston, Corey Kimmy, José Méndez, Richard Paul, Joseph Perez, Chester Wood and Christopher Wood. Nine Cornell Certificates in Liberal Arts also were awarded, to Berkley, Chislum, Dillard, Jarzynka, Johnston, Méndez and Paul, along with Jonathan M. Istvan and Adam Kitt. These students took multiple different types of classes such as liberal arts, social sciences and humanities.

The people who taught these classes were teaching assistants and faculty from the colleges of Cornell, Cayuga CC, Hobart and William Smith, the University of Rochester and Keuka College. The liberal arts certificate, which was made up of 18 credits of work and was made especially for the Prisoner Education Program, to appeal the best to them. This program has been considered by many to be successful, as Senior Program Officer Eugene Tobin’s has an article on the Mellon Foundation talking about how successful the program was.

According to the article in the 1970s that is when colleges started having programs with prisons through Pell grants, leading to them being able to educate these prisoners. This was until the mid 1990s when this decision was overturned as Congress decided to take away grants from them leading to these programs being stopped. This decision stayed this way until Barack Obama came into office, overturning the decision again and giving grants back to the program letting the prisoners able to get an education.

Called the “Second Chance Pell Pilot Program” which has a lot of optimism around it. There is no doubt that taking college courses reduces violence in prison, improves incarcerated students’ ties with their families, lowers recidivism rates, and improves job prospects upon release. The popular belief is that this program does a lot of positive for these prisoners such as make them less violent, better off with their family and gives them a better chance to get a job in the future.

It is also well known that it cost less to educate them, then to have them behind bars. This is especially concerning, because advocates of this program have pointed out that there are more African American males in prison than in college. These facts and many quotes such as from a young man in the program saying that spent his teen to his early twenties "on the outside" and that "Higher education has given me my humanity back.", show that there is a lot of hope for the program's future as long as they can keep the grants and funding coming.

References

External links 
  NY prison information 
 The Correctional Association of New York: Five Points Correctional Facility

Prisons in New York (state)
Seneca County, New York
2000 establishments in New York (state)